Copelatus tanaus is a species of diving beetle. It is part of the subfamily Copelatinae in the family Dytiscidae. It was described by Félix Guignot in 1953.

References

tanaus
Beetles described in 1953